Stephen John Coogan (born 14 October 1965) is an English actor, comedian, producer, and screenwriter. He is most known for creating original characters such as Alan Partridge, a socially inept and politically incorrect media personality, which he developed while working with Armando Iannucci on On the Hour and The Day Today. Partridge has featured in several television series and the 2013 film Alan Partridge: Alpha Papa. In 1999, he co-founded the production company Baby Cow Productions with Henry Normal. 

He began his career in the 1980s as a voice actor on the satirical puppet show Spitting Image and providing voice-overs for television advertisements. Coogan grew in prominence in the film industry in 2002, after starring in The Parole Officer and 24 Hour Party People. He continued to appear in films such as Around the World in 80 Days (2004), Hamlet 2 (2008), Tropic Thunder (2008), The Other Guys (2010), Ruby Sparks (2012), and the Night at the Museum films, and Greed (2019). He co-starred as himself with Rob Brydon in A Cock and Bull Story (2005), and the  BBC series The Trip (2010), The Trip to Italy (2014), The Trip to Spain (2017), and The Trip to Greece (2020), all of which were condensed into films.

Coogan has also played dramatic roles, including Marie Antoinette (2006), What Maisie Knew (2012), and portrayed Paul Raymond in the biographical film The Look of Love (2013) and Stan Laurel in Stan & Ollie (2018). In 2013, he co-wrote, produced, and starred in the film Philomena, which earned him nominations at the Golden Globes and BAFTAs, and at the Academy Awards for Best Adapted Screenplay and Best Picture.

Early life
Stephen John Coogan was born on 14 October 1965 in Middleton, Lancashire, the son of housewife Kathleen (née Coonan) and IBM engineer Anthony "Tony" Coogan. He has four brothers and one sister, and was raised Roman Catholic in a "lower-middle or upper-working class" family which emphasised the values of education. His younger brother Brendan was, for a few months, a presenter of Top Gear, while his elder brother Martin became the lead singer of rock band the Mock Turtles.

Coogan's mother is Irish and hails from County Mayo, while his father is also of Irish descent, his paternal grandparents – Margaret (from County Kilkenny) and Thomas Coogan (a tailor from County Cork) – having settled in Manchester shortly before the First World War. During the 1950s, his paternal grandfather established a dance hall for Irish immigrants. Coogan attended St. Thomas More Roman Catholic Primary School and Cardinal Langley Roman Catholic High School. He has stated that he had a happy childhood, and his parents fostered children on a short-term basis.

As a family, it was assumed that all the children would become teachers. Coogan had a talent for impersonation and wanted to go to drama school, despite being advised by a teacher that it could lead to a precarious profession. After five failed applications to various drama schools in London, he received a place at the New Music theatre company before gaining a place at the Manchester Polytechnic School of Drama, where he met future collaborator John Thomson.

Career

Early career
Coogan began his career as a comic and impressionist, performing regularly in Ipswich, before working as a voice artist for television advertisements and the satirical puppet show Spitting Image. In 1989, he appeared in a series of specially shot sketches in the Observation round in the long-running ITV game show The Krypton Factor. In 1992, Coogan won the Perrier Award at the Edinburgh Festival Fringe for his performance with long-time collaborator John Thomson, and starred alongside him and Caroline Aherne in a one-off Granada TV sketch show, The Dead Good Show. His most prominent characters developed at this time were Paul Calf, a stereotypical working class Mancunian, and his sister Pauline, played by Coogan in drag.

Alan Partridge

While working on the Radio 4 comedy On the Hour, Coogan created Alan Partridge, a parody of British sports presenters, with producer Armando Iannucci. Coogan described Partridge as a Little Englander, with right-wing values and poor taste. He is socially inept, often offending his guests, and has an inflated sense of importance and celebrity. According to Coogan, Partridge was originally a "one-note, sketchy character" and "freak show", but slowly became refined as a dysfunctional alter ego.

In 1992, Partridge hosted a spin-off Radio 4 spoof chat show, Knowing Me, Knowing You with Alan Partridge. On the Hour transferred to television as The Day Today in 1994, followed by Knowing Me, Knowing You later that year. In 1997, Coogan starred as Partridge in a BBC sitcom, I'm Alan Partridge, written by Coogan, Iannucci and Peter Baynham, following Partridge's life in a roadside hotel working for a small radio station. It earned two BAFTAs and was followed by a second series in 2002. After I'm Alan Partridge, Coogan tired of Partridge and limited him to smaller roles. Coogan said he did not want to say goodbye to Partridge, and that "as long as I can do my other things, that, to me, is the perfect balance". He later said that Partridge had once been an "albatross" but had become "a battered, comfortable old leather jacket". 

Partridge returned in 2010 with a series of shorts, Mid Morning Matters with Alan Partridge, written with new writers Rob and Neil Gibbons. It was followed by the spoof memoirs I, Partridge: We Need to Talk About Alan (2011) and Nomad (2016), the feature film Alan Partridge: Alpha Papa (2013), and several TV specials. In his memoir, Coogan wrote that Alpha Papa was the hardest he had ever worked and that the production was fraught; however, he was proud of the finished film. In 2019, Partridge returned to the BBC with This Time with Alan Partridge, a spoof of magazine shows such as The One Show, followed by an Audible podcast, From the Oasthouse, in 2020. In April 2022, Coogan began an Alan Partridge tour, Stratagem. Reviewing the show for the Guardian, Brian Logan noted that though Coogan had once tired of Partridge, he now "clearly takes pleasure in the performance".

Critics have praised Partridge's complexity, realism and pathos. Vanity Fair called him a British national treasure and the Guardian described him as "one of the greatest and most beloved comic creations of the last few decades". Partridge is credited with influencing cringe comedies such as The Inbetweeners, Nighty Night and Peep Show. In 2001 a poll by Channel 4, Partridge was voted seventh on their list of the 100 Greatest TV Characters.

TV roles
Paul Calf began as a character named 'Duncan Disorderly' in Coogan's early stand-up routines. Calf first came to wider public notice in 1993, with several appearances on Saturday Zoo, a late-night variety show presented by Jonathan Ross on Channel 4. Paul has appeared in two video diaries, an episode of Coogan's Run, and in various stand-up performances. He is an unemployed Mancunian wastrel with a particular hatred of students. His catchphrase, spoken to disparage something or someone, is "Bag o' shite". Paul lives in a council house in the fictional town of Ottle with his mother and his sister, Pauline Calf (also played by Coogan). His father, Pete Calf (played by Coogan in Coogan's Run) died some time before the first video diary was made. For a long time he was obsessed with getting back together with his ex-girlfriend, Julie. Paul's best friend is "Fat" Bob (played by John Thomson), a car mechanic who eventually married Pauline. Paul supports Manchester City and is very partial to Wagon Wheels. He wears Burton suits, sports a bleached mullet hairstyle, and drives a Ford Cortina. Pauline Calf's Wedding Video, also known as Three Fights, Two Weddings and a Funeral, won the 1995 BAFTA award for Best Comedy.

Other Coogan creations include Tommy Saxondale, Duncan Thicket, Ernest Eckler and Portuguese Eurovision Song Contest winner Tony Ferrino. Duncan Thicket has appeared in a tour of live shows. Other TV shows he has starred in include Coogan's Run, Dr. Terrible's House of Horrible, Monkey Trousers and Saxondale. Coogan has provided voices for the animated series I Am Not an Animal and Bob and Margaret, two Christmas specials featuring Robbie the Reindeer, and an episode of the BBC Radio Four spoof sci-fi series Nebulous.

He played the Gnat in the 1998 TV adaptation of Alice Through the Looking-Glass starring Kate Beckinsale, and also starred in BBC2's The Private Life of Samuel Pepys in 2003, and Cruise of the Gods in 2002. In 2006, he had a cameo in the Little Britain Christmas special as a pilot taking Lou and Andy to Disneyland. In 2007, Coogan played a psychiatrist on Larry David's Curb Your Enthusiasm on HBO, and in 2008, starred in the BBC1 drama Sunshine.

In 2010, he worked again with Brydon and Michael Winterbottom for the partially improvised BBC2 sitcom The Trip, in which he and Brydon tour northern restaurants. He is set to play Jimmy Savile, the disgraced British television presenter and sex offender, in an forthcoming BBC One series, The Reckoning. Coogan said he did not take the decision to play Savile lightly, and that it was a "horrific story which – however harrowing – needs to be told". The drama was expected to be broadcast by the BBC in 2022, but has now been pushed back to 2024. A source said, “The four-part drama is being edited in such a meticulous and careful way, so as not to create more pain and suffering for Savile’s victims.”

Film roles

One of Coogan's most notable film roles was Factory Records boss, Tony Wilson in the film, 24 Hour Party People.

Coogan has played himself several times on screen. First, in one of the vignettes of Jim Jarmusch's 2003 film Coffee and Cigarettes, alongside Alfred Molina. Second, in 2006 Coogan starred with Rob Brydon in Michael Winterbottom's A Cock and Bull Story, a self-referential film of the "unfilmable" self-referential novel Tristram Shandy by Laurence Sterne. In the film, Coogan plays a fictional, womanising version of himself. Thirdly, he played himself in the 2010 film, The Trip alongside Brydon. The movie was followed in 2014 with the film, The Trip to Italy, about him and Brydon taking a food-tasting trip through Italy, followed by The Trip to Spain (2017) and The Trip to Greece (2020). He worked again with director Winterbottom in The Look of Love, about '50s porn-king, Paul Raymond. 

The first film that Coogan co-wrote with Henry Normal was The Parole Officer, in which he also acted alongside Ben Miller and Lena Headey. He has an uncredited cameo in Hot Fuzz, scripted by Shaun of the Dead writers Simon Pegg and Edgar Wright. He also starred in the Night at the Museum trilogy in which he played Octavius, a miniature Roman general figure, alongside Owen Wilson's Jedediah, a miniature cowboy figure.

Coogan's most acclaimed work to date is the dramedy, Philomena, which he co-wrote, produced, and starred in with Judi Dench. This performance earned him a Golden Globe nomination, among many other nominations (and some wins). Philomena was nominated for the Academy Award for Best Picture. In 2018, Coogan played English comedian, Stan Laurel in the film biopic, Stan & Ollie, starring opposite American actor John C. Reilly, who played Oliver Hardy. In September 2020, Coogan announced that he would star in an upcoming movie about finding the bones of King Richard III. The movie, titled, The Lost King was released in 2022, starring Sally Hawkins in the lead role of Philippa Langley, with Coogan playing her husband, John.

Return to stand-up
In March 2008, it was confirmed that Coogan would return to doing comedy as part of his first stand-up tour in ten years. The tour, named "Steve Coogan as Alan Partridge and other less successful characters", saw the return of some of his old characters including Paul Calf and Alan Partridge. Reviews of the tour were mixed. Much of the criticism focused on the apparent unrehearsed quality of some of the performances and on Coogan's nervous stage presence. Chortle comedy guide described it as "most definitely a show of two-halves: the superlative Alan Partridge plus a collection of characters that are not only less successful, but woefully less funny".

As the tour progressed and the problems were ironed out, reviews were very positive. Dominic Maxwell of The Times described the show as "twice as entertaining as most other comedy shows this year". Brian Logan of The Guardian awarded it four stars and described it as "shamelessly funny". Reviews such as the one from the Trent FM Arena exemplified how much the show had improved after dealing with the glitches on its first few dates: "When Steve Coogan first brought this show to Nottingham last month, the reviews were poor...  the intervening weeks have made a big difference, and last night's audience at the Trent FM Arena went home happy. More please, and soon."

In 2009, Coogan was featured, alongside Vic Reeves, Bob Mortimer and Julia Davis, in the spoof documentary TV film Steve Coogan – The Inside Story. The same year he spoke on the influence of Monty Python on his comedy when he appeared in the television documentary, Monty Python: Almost the Truth (Lawyers Cut).

Baby Cow Productions
Coogan, along with his writing partner Henry Normal, founded Baby Cow Productions in 1999. Together, they have served as executive producers for shows such as The Mighty Boosh, Nighty Night, Marion and Geoff, Gavin & Stacey, Human Remains and Moone Boy, as well as the Alan Partridge feature film Alan Partridge: Alpha Papa. They have also produced Where Are the Joneses?, an online sitcom which uses wiki technology to allow the audience to upload scripts and storyline ideas.

In 2008, BBC Worldwide bought a 25% stake in the production company. It did not offer the largest sum, but was chosen by Coogan and Normal owing to their previous work with and strong connection with the BBC. In 2016, after Henry Normal stood down, Christine Langan (head of BBC Film at the time) was hired by Coogan (creative director of Baby Cow Productions) as the new CEO; this led to BBC Worldwide increasing its stake to 73%.

Since joining, Langan has executive-produced all of the content from Baby Cow Productions, including Camping, Stan & Ollie, Zapped and The Witchfinder.

In the media

Public image

Coogan has said that he likes to "keep [himself] private", and added: "I have never wanted to be famous, as such – fame is a by-product." He has been a British tabloid fixture since as early as 1996, and has stated that such outlets have subjected him to entrapment and blackmail, printed obvious lies about him, and have targeted his family and friends in attempts to extract stories from them. Coogan in some cases strongly denied allegations, but in others did not contest them because he wanted to shield vulnerable friends from adverse publicity. 

The tabloids also published intrusive information about his relationships and the schooling of his child. Coogan has also been critical of the broadsheet press, saying they have colluded with the tabloids in the interests of selling newspapers. In 2005, he said "The Guardian tends to have its cake and eat it. It waits for the tabloids to dish the dirt and then it talks about the tabloids dishing the dirt while enjoying it themselves." However, he later gave credit to the same newspaper for its investigation of the phone hacking scandal. He has said that the press, by persistently intruding in his private life, has effectively made him "immune" to further attack as his "closet is empty of skeletons".

Phone hacking scandal

Coogan favours reform and regulation of the British press. He became a prominent figure in the News International phone hacking scandal as one of the celebrities who took action against the British tabloids in light of these events. He was made aware by his phone service provider of "possible anomalies" on his phone in 2005 and 2006. In 2010, Coogan's legal firm obtained a partially redacted version of Glenn Mulcaire's hacking notebook by a court order which showed Coogan had been targeted and his personal information was in the possession of Mulcaire.

Mulcaire was forced by the High Court of Justice to disclose to Coogan's legal team who amongst the staff at the News of the World ordered him to hack phones. This information was obtained by Coogan's lawyers on 26 August 2011. Interviewed on Newsnight on 8 July 2011, Coogan said he was "delighted" by the closure of the News of the World and said it was a "fantastic day for journalism". He said the idea of press freedom was used by the tabloids as a "smokescreen for selling papers with tittle-tattle" and said the argument against press regulation was "morally bankrupt".

Coogan provided an eight-page witness statement to the Leveson Inquiry, and appeared at the inquiry on 22 November 2011 to discuss the evidence. He said he was there reluctantly representing a lot of celebrities who felt they could not speak out for fear of reprisals from the tabloid press.

In March 2021, Coogan said "the tabloid press is controlled by a handful of tax shy billionaires with an agenda. Anyone who stands up to the press is attacked by them because they're bullies." He added "the fact that Meghan Markle and Harry were attacked has nothing to do with jet-setting hypocrisy. It's because they broke the golden rule, which is to leave us alone and we'll go easy on you next time."

Personal life
Coogan married Caroline Hickman in 2002; they divorced in 2005. He entered rehab for personal issues. He dated model China Chow for three years. In March 2011, Coogan was guest editor for lads mag Loaded, where he met and began dating glamour model Loretta "Elle" Basey. They were together until 2014. He has a daughter from a previous four-year relationship with solicitor Anna Cole.

Although raised Catholic, Coogan is now an atheist. A motoring enthusiast, he has owned a succession of Ferrari cars, but stopped buying them after realising that the depreciation and running costs were greater than hiring a private plane. In February 2016, he was fined £670 and banned from driving for 28 days after being caught speeding in Brighton. In August 2019, he escaped the usual six-month ban for a further speeding offence by saying that his next TV series depended on his ability to drive; he was given a two-month ban and a £750 fine. He has been open about his struggle with depression and has said "I will always be a recovering addict".

Until 2017, Coogan resided in Ovingdean Grange in Ovingdean, East Sussex.

Coogan's autobiography, Easily Distracted, was published in October 2015.

Coogan announced, on an episode of The Late Late Show, in January 2019, that he was "half-way through" the process of applying for Irish citizenship.

Political views
Coogan supports the Labour Party. He believes that the Conservative Party think "people are plebs" and that "they like to pat people on the head". He voiced his support for abolishing the British monarchy in 2013.

In August 2014, Coogan was one of 200 public figures who were signatories to a letter to The Guardian expressing their hope that Scotland would vote to remain part of the United Kingdom in September's referendum on that issue.

In June 2017, Coogan endorsed Labour Party leader Jeremy Corbyn in the 2017 UK general election. He hosted a rally for Corbyn in Birmingham, opening by saying: "The Tory tactic was to try to make this a choice between Theresa May and Jeremy Corbyn, but this has backfired as people – and I readily admit to being one of them – have started to listen to what Jeremy Corbyn says rather than what other people have been saying about him."

In November 2019, along with other public figures, Coogan signed a letter defending Corbyn, describing him as "a beacon of hope in the struggle against emergent far-right nationalism, xenophobia and racism in much of the democratic world" and endorsed him in the 2019 general election. In December 2019, along with 42 other leading cultural figures, he signed a letter endorsing the Labour Party under Corbyn's leadership in the 2019 general election. The letter stated that "Labour's election manifesto under Jeremy Corbyn's leadership offers a transformative plan that prioritises the needs of people and the planet over private profit and the vested interests of a few".

Filmography

Film

Television

Awards and nominations
Coogan's show Steve Coogan in character with John Thomson was winner of the Perrier Award for best show at the 1992 Edinburgh Fringe. He has won numerous awards for his work in TV including British Comedy Awards, BAFTAs and The South Bank Show award for comedy. In 2003, he was listed in The Observer as one of the 50 funniest acts in British comedy. In 2005, a poll to find the Comedians' Comedian saw him being voted amongst the top 20 greatest comedy acts ever by fellow comedians and comedy insiders.

Stand-up tours

References

External links

 
 
 
 Coming to a cinema near you ... Alan Partridge as Our Man in Tashkent
 Steve Coogan: From a Partridge to 'Cock and Bull Fresh Air interview by Terry Gross
 Steve Coogan on BBC Radio Desert Island Discs
 Profile on Chortle

1965 births
Living people
20th-century English comedians
20th-century English male actors
21st-century English comedians
21st-century English male actors
Actors from Lancashire
Alumni of Manchester Metropolitan University
Best Adapted Screenplay BAFTA Award winners
Best Comedy Performance BAFTA Award (television) winners
Best Male Comedy Performance BAFTA Award (television) winners
Comedians from Lancashire
Male actors from Lancashire
English atheists
English autobiographers
English film producers
English impressionists (entertainers)
English male comedians
British male comedy actors
English male film actors
English male non-fiction writers
English male screenwriters
English male television actors
English male voice actors
English people of Irish descent
English republicans
Former Roman Catholics
Labour Party (UK) people
People from Brighton and Hove
People from Middleton, Greater Manchester
Writers from Lancashire